The TWJ Foundation is a charity providing grants to ENT Specialist Registrars who are currently on a numbered otolaryngological training programme in the British Isles, in order to enhance their otological experience. These grants include major overseas Otology Fellowships.



History 
The TWJ Foundation (Thomas Whickham Jones) was founded in 1954 and became a registered charity on 14 March 1974 through the generosity of Mrs. Lilian Wickham Higgs and her son Thomas. Mrs Higgs herself was deaf and the Foundation was set up in memory of her father Thomas Wickham-Jones (TWJ 1847-1929). His success as a City of London wharfinger was largely instrumental in enabling it to be funded.

The Higgs Charitable trust was formed with the intention that it should fund the TWJ. Its trustees have indeed acted from the start as the TWJ's largest benefactor and the TWJ continues to be most grateful to them for their generosity.

Patrick Hunter Jobson, a Consultant in Otorhinolaryngology, who had married one of TWJ's granddaughters, became the Foundation's first executive Chairman. Patrick Hunter Jobson gave his time and talents unstintingly during the period to 1994 when so much was achieved. His ideals have been continued through his successor David Wright as Chairman and by the inclusion of John Evans as a Trustee.

Objectives
The TWJ Foundation's objectives are to benefit otology and audiology within the National Health Service by the promotion of education and research. The Foundation hopes to generate a beneficial influence on clinical otology in the United Kingdom.

More than fifty per cent of British otologists have been associated in some way with a TWJ grant and it is the aim of the Foundation to continue to reach as many young otologists in training from all parts of the United Kingdom.

References

External links
TWJ Foundation Website
British Association of Otorhinolaryngologists - Head & Neck Surgeons

Health charities in the United Kingdom
Otorhinolaryngology organizations